vipw is a small computer program which enables a Unix system administrator to  comfortably edit the "passwd" and "Shadow password" files. It comes bundled in the "Shadow" software package.

vigr does similar thing for /etc/group and /etc/gshadow.

References
 The vipw manpage, 26 September 1997, in the Debian passwd package version 1:4.0.13-6

External links
 vipw man page

Unix configuration utilities